The Dahla are a tribe of the Hazara people in Afghanistan.

One study indicated that the Dahla tribe were possibly extinct, and a subset of the Poladha tribe.

See also 
 List of Hazara tribes

References

Hazara tribes